Trần Cảo may refer to:

 Trần Cảo (king), king of Vietnam (1426–1428) at the end of the Ming domination
 Trần Cảo (rebel leader) (died after 1525), Vietnamese rebel leader at the end of the Lê Dynasty
 Trần Cảo Rebellion, 1516–1521, rebellion against the Lê Dynasty led by Trần Cảo

See also
Trần Cao Vân (1866–1916), mandarin of the Nguyễn Dynasty